Hyloxalus picachos is a species of frog in the family Dendrobatidae. It is endemic to Colombia where it is only known from its type locality in the Parque Nacional Cordillera los Picachos, Cordillera Oriental of Caquetá Department.
Its natural habitat is montane humid forest where it lives on the forest floor.

References

picachos
Amphibians of Colombia
Endemic fauna of Colombia
Taxa named by Luis Aurelio Coloma
Amphibians described in 2000
Taxonomy articles created by Polbot